Compsosoma v-notatum is a species of beetle in the family Cerambycidae. It was described by Vigors in 1825. It is known from Brazil.

References

Compsosomatini
Beetles described in 1825